Mazraeh (also Romanized as Mazra‘eh; also known as Mazra‘eh Farghan) is a village in Fareghan Rural District, Fareghan District, Hajjiabad County, Hormozgan Province, Iran. At the 2006 census, its population was 506, in 120 families.

References 

Populated places in Hajjiabad County